Koshka means cat in Russian and may refer to
Feodor Koshka, born Feodor Andreevich Kobylin, died 1407, Russian noble 
Koshka, a Gori Municipality settlement in Georgia
Koshka Yavr (air base) in Murmansk Oblast, Russia 
Kvemo-Koshka, a settlement in South Ossetia
Mount Koshka in Crimea 
Russkaya Koshka, a spit in Chukotka, Russia 
Zemo-Koshka, a settlement in South Ossetia
Koshka, a cat girl in the game Vainglory